Coca Bloos (born 1 October 1946) is a Romanian actress. She appeared in more than forty films since 1988.

Selected filmography

References

External links 

1946 births
Living people
Romanian film actresses
People from Piatra Neamț